Bhagowal Kalan is a village located alongside the Tanda road in Gujrat District, Punjab, Pakistan. It was the head of Jagir state ruled by Kahlon Jats. 

Villages in Gujrat District